Helsingborg Basketbollklubb  is a basketball club based in Helsingborg, Sweden. The association is a continuation of Helsingborgs Basket, which went bankrupt in 2009. In the 2021–22 season, the men's team will play in Superettan and the women's team in the Swedish Basketball League.

History

Pre HBBK era 
The current association was established on 12 May 2009. Its predecessor, Helsingborgs Basket, formed in 1978 as a merger between IFK Helsingborg basketball section, which started in 1956, and BK Panthers, before eventually breaking away from IFK in the early 1970s. IFK Helsingborg won its first and so far only championship title in 1969. Besides this, IFK Helsingborg also won five cup titles, including the last time the Cup was held in 1978. In 1986, Helsingborgs Basket were relegated from the top division, and a few years later in 1992, found themselves in Division 2. The club returned to the Swedish Basketball League (the highest tier of Swedish basketball) in 2003. In 2006 and 2008 the club played under the name Öresundskraft Basketball.

On April 9, 2009, the club withdrew from the Swedish basketball league for the 2009/2010 season, due to a lack of sponsors. The economic situation eventually became too difficult and as Helsingborg did not want to endorse a new loan, the club filed for bankruptcy on May 11, 2009. The day after Helsingborgs Baskets bankruptcy there was a meeting where it was decided that a new organization would be created under the name, Helsingborg Basketball Club (HBBK). Due to HBBK being a new club, both the men's and women's teams were forced to qualify for Division 2 for the season 2009/2010. Both went through from their qualifier and both advanced to Basket One for the 2010/2011 season.

Men's time in Superettan

2018–2020 
The first season in Superettan was a very memorable one as they ended up in fourth place with a 12–12 record.

The men's last game during their first stint in Superettan ended up, as most other games that season, in a loss. Due to the COVID-19 pandemic the season was ended early and not all the games were played. This meant that they finished the season in last place with a 3–22 record. Due to the pandemic and the season ending early SBBF were forced to make the decision on which tier they were to play in during their next season. This decision ended up being that they were to be relegated.

2021 
Due to the coronavirus pandemic and restrictions only one game was played by Helsingborg in Basketettan Södra during the 2020–21 season. The Swedish Basketball Federation was therefore forced to make decisions out of the ordinary this season as well. With HBBK’s will to play in Superettan as strong as ever they chose to apply for a spot in the second tier for the following season. After proving to the federation that the organization had a strong enough base the decision was made that Helsingborg would play in Superettan once again.

Women's first season in SBL 
The first season in Basketligan dam was a season filled with tough experiences. It took the team 11 games to get their first win in SBL, also the first-ever victory in the highest tier of Swedish basketball ever. This would be their only win in their inaugural season, ending with a 1–21 record. Due to the decision made by the Swedish Basketball Federation on June 11, 2020 that no team will be relegated from SBL after the 2020–21 season. It gave HBBK the security of staying up.

Kärnan Cup 
Kärnan Cup is an annual basketball tournament hosted by Helsingborg BBK. The tournament is available for all teams around the world and acts like a kickstart to the basketball season. The cup takes place during the end of August, before the season starts.

Season by season

Men's Season by season

Women's Season by season

Players

Current rosters

Notable players

Media and broadcasting 
For the upcoming 2021-22 season, both the men's and women's teams will have their games streamed on Solidsport. This is in accordance with an agreement between the Swedish Basketball Federation and Solidsport. In addition to all games being available on Solidsport, a select group of games will be available on SVT Play. Also, before deals were struck between Solidsport and SBBF, HBBK streamed their games on YouTube, these games are still available today on HBBK's youtube channel.

 Men's streaming
 Women's streaming

Honours and achievements
Swedish League
 Winners (1): 1968–69

References

Basketball teams in Sweden
Basketball teams established in 1956
Sport in Helsingborg
Women's basketball teams in Sweden